Booze Traveler is an American travel television series hosted by Jack Maxwell. The premise involves Maxwell, a native of South Boston, traveling the world to partake in international (and domestic) alcohol-based customs, as well as observe the culture of specific areas in a more general sense. It premiered on Travel Channel on November 24, 2014. Season 1 consisted of 15 episodes, and Season 2 has 16 episodes. Season 3 began airing in December 2016 with 13 episodes.  Season 4 began airing in December 2017 with 16 episodes.

Episodes

Season 1

Season 2

Season 3

Season 4

References

External links
 
 

2014 American television series debuts
English-language television shows
American travel television series